James Cleland "Bubs" Britton (April 24, 1903 – March 30, 1984) was a Canadian diplomat and sportsman. He was appointed Chargé d'affaires to Japan, then Ambassador to Italy, and then Ambassador Extraordinary and Plenipotentiary to Thailand.

Biography
Britton was born in York, Ontario in 1903 and was educated at Queen's University in Kingston, Ontario where he played both football and ice hockey on the school teams. In the early 1930s Britton also played ice hockey in the Ottawa City Hockey League for the Ottawa Shamrocks and the Ottawa Rideaus.

During the 1936–1937 season Britton worked as an assistant trade commissioner in Johannesburg, South Africa where he helped organize the South African Ice Hockey Association (SAIHA).

He would later work as a diplomat for Canada in Japan, Italy and Thailand.

Britton died on March 30, 1984 at the Joseph Brant Hospital in Burlington, Ontario at an age of 80.

References

Notes

External links
Foreign Affairs and International Trade Canada Complete List of Posts 

Place of birth missing
Ambassadors of Canada to Thailand
Ambassadors of Canada to Italy
Ambassadors of Canada to Japan
1903 births
1984 deaths